Glassy Mountain is a mountain in the Chattahoochee National Forest in Rabun County, Georgia, with its USGS GNIS summit at , which is  AMSL.  It is bypassed on its northern flank by a major two-lane highway that carries U.S. Route 76 and Georgia State Route 2 east and west.

It is also the location of NOAA Weather Radio station KXI81, which serves nearby Clayton, Georgia (to the east-northeast), Lake Burton (to the west and southwest), and adjacent areas of northeast Georgia, upstate South Carolina, and western North Carolina.  A radio tower and a fire lookout tower are both located atop the mountain.

See also

List of mountains in Georgia (U.S. state)

Mountains of Georgia (U.S. state)
Mountains of Rabun County, Georgia